Monroe Township is a township in Johnson County, Iowa, USA.

History
Monroe Township was organized in 1846.  It is one of the townships on the northern edge of Johnson County, bordering Linn County.

References

Townships in Johnson County, Iowa
Townships in Iowa
1846 establishments in Iowa Territory